Frederick Meadows (11 November 1886 – 17 December 1975) was a Canadian athlete.  He competed in the 1908 Summer Olympics in London. In the 1500 metres, Meadows placed third in his initial semifinal heat with a time of 4:12.2.  The heat was won by James P. Sullivan in 4:07.6.

References

Sources

External links
 

1886 births
1975 deaths
Track and field athletes from Ontario
Olympic track and field athletes of Canada
Athletes (track and field) at the 1908 Summer Olympics
Canadian male middle-distance runners